"The Leap" is the 24th and final episode of season 4 of the How I Met Your Mother TV series and 88th overall. It originally aired on May 18, 2009.

Plot 

Future Ted (Bob Saget) describes the evening of his 31st birthday. Over the previous 3 days, Ted had been working hard to design a hat-shaped rib restaurant. As he pulls an all-nighter in an attempt to win his firm a contract, Marshall attempts to lure Ted to the roof for a surprise 31st birthday party, which Ted waves off because he thinks Marshall would never schedule two surprise parties in a row. Barney asks for Ted's blessing to pursue Robin, using an obvious analogy involving a suit.

Disappointed at his inability to throw a good party, Marshall stands on the ledge of the roof, ready to jump from their apartment roof to the neighboring building's roof (beautifully furnished with a hot tub), about seven feet away. A flashback shows Marshall's attempts over the last years to get the courage to jump. Lily tries to dissuade him by falsely claiming that she is pregnant, resulting in Marshall saying that he noticed Lily gaining weight, and Lily storming off afterwards.

Downstairs, while Ted is hard at work, the goat scuttles through the apartment. Ted calls Lily, anxious and annoyed at its presence. After he repeatedly takes a wash-cloth away from the animal, the goat mauls Ted, and he is sent to the hospital. Finally, when he shows up to his restaurant design meeting, his clients decide to go with Swedish avant-garde architecture collective Sven, instead of him.

Meanwhile, Barney has decided to confess his feelings for Robin, but before he can say anything, she says that she loves him. He quickly reacts by saying they should just be friends, and picks up a random girl at the party. Lily then tells him that Robin overheard his suit analogy with Ted, and was worried about what to do. After discussing it with Lily and Marshall (who reveal they had known for months), Robin decides to "Mosby" Barney, telling him she loves him right away, just like Ted did. Barney discovers the truth, gets disappointed, and confronts Robin at the hospital. She admits to "Mosbying" him, but then tries to do it again, until the two confess their complicated feelings for each other and kiss. After this, they decide to discuss it later.

Finally, back in the apartment, Ted laments his situation, and Lily tells him to stop chasing something that is not working, and let the universe take over for a bit. When Lily tells Ted that maybe he should just take "the leap" and do what the world seems to want him to do, Marshall takes the advice literally, and leaps from the roof to the other building, followed by the rest of the gang. Ted is the last to jump, and cheered on by his friends, makes the leap to the other building alongside them, and later accepts the professor job at the University.

The episode ends with Ted, now Professor Mosby, in front of a class of students. Future Ted tells his children that despite being the year where he was left at the altar, knocked out by a crazed bartender, fired and attacked by a goat, it was the best year of his life. It was all worth it, because not only did it lead him into the best job he ever had but it also began him on the journey that would lead him to his future wife... as Future Ted reveals that she was one of the students in the class.

Production 
This episode was filmed out of order in order to allow Alyson Hannigan, who was about to begin her maternity leave, to appear.

Critical response 

Donna Bowman of The A.V. Club graded the episode B+.

"Prophets" by A.C. Newman features at the start and the end of the episode, as well as in the first episode of the season. Greg Chow on the Rolling Stone website complimented the song choice, describing it as a "transitional [song] of triumph" which "pretty much sums up Ted in a nutshell". It was also mentioned in an article in The Hollywood Reporter.

References

External links 
 

How I Met Your Mother (season 4) episodes
2009 American television episodes
Television episodes about birthdays